John Christopher Loder, 3rd Baron Wakehurst (23 September 1925 – 29 July 2022) was a British hereditary peer. He served the title of Baron Wakehurst, after succeeding his father John Loder, 2nd Baron Wakehurst upon his death in 1970.

Loder was born on 23 September 1925. He served as a member of the House of Lords from 1970 to 1999. 

Lord Wakehurst died on 29 July 2022, at the age of 96.

References 

1925 births
2022 deaths
Barons in the Peerage of the United Kingdom
Members of the British House of Lords

Wakehurst